This is a list of BIEM member organisations.

 Albania ALBAUTOR
 Argentina SADAIC
 Australia AMCOS
 Austria AUSTROMECHANA
 Belgium SABAM
 Brazil SBACEM
 Bulgaria MUSICAUTOR
 Canada SODRAC
 Chile SCD
 China MCSC
 Croatia HDS
 Czechia OSA
 Denmark, Norway, Sweden, Finland, Iceland, Lithuania and Estonia NCB
 France SDRM, SACEM, SGDL, SACD
 Georgia GESAP
 Germany GEMA
 Greece AEPI
 Guinea-Bissau SACEM
 Hong Kong CASH
 Hungary ARTISJUS
 Israel ACUM
 Italy, The Vatican, San Marino SIAE
 Japan JASRAC
 Malaysia MACP
 Mexico SACM
 Netherlands STEMRA
 Peru APDAYC
 Philippines FILSCAP
 Poland Society of Authors ZAiKS
 Portugal  Sociedade Portuguesa de Autores (SPA)
 Romania UCMR-ADA
 Russian Federation RAO
 Serbia and Montenegro SOKOJ
 Slovakia SOZA
 Slovenia SAZAS
 Spain SGAE
 Switzerland, Liechtenstein SUISA
 Trinidad, Tobago COTT
 Turkey MESAM
 Ukraine UACRR
 United Kingdom MCPS
 Uruguay AGADU
 Venezuela SACVEN

BIEM members